The Tunisia national under-20 football team, nicknamed Les Aigles de Carthage (The Eagles of Carthage or The Carthage Eagles), belongs to the Tunisian Football Federation. Since 1977 the team has played eight times in the African Youth Championship, UNAF U-20 Tournament and twice in the FIFA U-20 World Cup (then known as the "FIFA World Youth Championship").

History

Current staff

Competition records
 Champions   Runners-up   Third place   Fourth place

Red border color indicates tournament was held on home soil.

FIFA U-20 World Cup record

Africa U-20 Cup of Nations record

Arab Cup U-20 record

UNAF U-20 Tournament record

Current squad 
The following players were called up for the 2021 UNAF U-20 Tournament.

Honours 
 African Youth Championship:
 Runners-up (1):  1985
 UNAF U-20 Tournament:
 Champions (8):  :2005, 2007, 2009, 2012, 2019, 2020, 2021, 2022
 Runners-up (3):  :2008, 2010, 2015
 Third Place (1):  :2006
 Arab Cup U-20:
 Champions (1):  :2012
 Runners-up (1):  :2020

See also 
 Tunisia women's national under-20 football team
 Tunisia national football team
 Tunisia A' national football team
 Tunisia national under-23 football team
 Tunisia national under-17 football team
 Tunisia national under-15 football team

References

African national under-20 association football teams
under-20